The Second Statute of Repeal, an act of the Parliament of England (1 & 2 Ph. & M. c. 8) passed in the Parliament of Queen Mary I and King Philip in 1555, followed the First Statute of Repeal of 1553. The first statute had abolished all religious legislation passed under Edward VI and the second statute built on it by abolishing all religious legislation passed against the papacy from 1529 (the fall of Cardinal Thomas Wolsey,) in Henry VIII's reign. It did this while allowing Mary to keep the title of Supreme Head of the Church of England, a title which had been given to the monarch of England by Henry VIII's Act of Supremacy, passed in 1534. It was supported by the landed classes as it allowed them to keep the monastic land which they had acquired after the dissolution of the monasteries.

The statutes of repeal were eventually nullified by Elizabeth I's Act of Uniformity 1558.

See also
 English Reformation
 Revival of the Heresy Acts

References

External links
 Apparent partial text of the Second Statute of Repeal

1555 in law
1555 in England
Acts of the Parliament of England (1485–1603)
Counter-Reformation